S. P. Rajkumar  is an Indian film director, who directs Tamil films.

Career
He started his film career as a dialogue writer for the 1997 film Once More. In 2000, he directed his second feature film En Purushan Kuzhanthai Maathiri, which turned out to be a flop. His subsequent ventures Ponmanam (1998) is a hit and Karmegham (2003) is unsuccessful. A proposed film in 2003 titled Thoodhu with Bhavana was shelved.

Only after six years, he started his next project Azhagar Malai, which was a sleeper hit. His fifth film, titled Sura, starring Vijay in the lead role.

Filmography

As director

Films

Serials

As actor
 Nattamai (1994) - As a deaf man who mistakes Goundamani's statement as marriage ("Namma Pasupathi Teachera Vachurukaango")
 Rasigan (1994) - As a person who mistakes a beaten Goundamani as a beggar ("Yaenne Pichai Edukireenga")
 Periya Kudumbam (1995) - As a person who waits at the bus stop ("Kunnakudi Bus Eppo")
 En Purushan Kuzhandhai Maadhiri (2001) - As a Vadivelu's friend who meets at a tea shop
 6'2 (2005) - As a person who warns Vadivelu not to interfere in the fight between two brothers ("Naangalum Marudha Kaaranthan")

As lyricist
January Nilave (En Uyir Neethane)
All songs (Pattaya Kelappanum Pandya)
Vaazhavaikkum (En Purushan Kuzhandhai Maadhiri)

References

20th-century Indian film directors
Tamil film directors
Tamil screenwriters
Living people
21st-century Indian film directors
Year of birth missing (living people)